Lee MacDougall is a Canadian actor, writer and theatre director. Originally from Kirkland Lake, Ontario, he studied at the University of Toronto and Ryerson University before launching his career as an actor.

He acted primarily on stage, as well as having guest roles in film and television, until writing his first play, High Life, in the early 1990s. A comedy-drama based on a group of drug addicts he met while acting in a regional theatre production, the play won the Dora Mavor Moore Award for Outstanding New Play, Mid-Sized Theatre Division, in 1996, and was a shortlisted Governor General's Award finalist for English-language drama at the 1997 Governor General's Awards. He later wrote the screenplay for the 2009 film adaptation High Life, for which he received a Genie Award nomination for Best Adapted Screenplay at the 31st Genie Awards.

His later plays have included The Gingko Tree, Resistance, Her Wonders and an adaptation of W. O. Mitchell's novel Who Has Seen the Wind. He has also published a number of short stories.

As an actor, he is now most noted for his role in the original cast of the musical Come from Away.

He lives in Stratford, Ontario with his husband, theatre director and choreographer Tim French.

Filmography

References

External links

20th-century Canadian dramatists and playwrights
20th-century Canadian short story writers
20th-century Canadian male actors
21st-century Canadian dramatists and playwrights
21st-century Canadian short story writers
21st-century Canadian male actors
Canadian male stage actors
Canadian male musical theatre actors
Canadian male dramatists and playwrights
Canadian male short story writers
Canadian male screenwriters
Canadian LGBT dramatists and playwrights
Canadian gay actors
Canadian gay writers
People from Kirkland Lake
People from Stratford, Ontario
Male actors from Ontario
Writers from Ontario
University of Toronto alumni
Toronto Metropolitan University alumni
Dora Mavor Moore Award winners
Living people
Year of birth missing (living people)
21st-century Canadian screenwriters
Gay screenwriters
Gay dramatists and playwrights
21st-century Canadian LGBT people
20th-century Canadian LGBT people